Edmund Fortescue (1560–1624) of Fallapit in the parish of East Allington, Devon, was an English Member of Parliament.

Origins
He was the eldest son and heir of John Fortescue (1525-1595) of Fallapit (whose monumental brass survives in East Allington Church) by his wife Honora Speccot, a daughter of Edmund Speccot (1499-1557) of Speccot, in the parish of Merton, Devon, and succeeded his father in 1595.

Career
He was elected a Member of Parliament  for Old Sarum in 1593 and served as Sheriff of Devon for 1622–3.

Marriage and children
He married Mary Champernown, a daughter of Henry Champernown of Modbury in Devon, by whom he had at least one son.

Death and burial
He died in 1624 and was buried at East Allington, Devon.

References

1560 births
1624 deaths
English MPs 1593
High Sheriffs of Devon
Edmund